The Battle of Un no Kuchi (referred to in Japanese as 海ノ口城, un no kuchi jou, literally Un no Kuchi Castle) in 1536 was the first major victory for Takeda Harunobu, aged fifteen at the time. He would later take on the name Takeda Shingen, and grow to become one of Japan's most famous warlords.

Battle 
Harunobu's father, Takeda Nobutora, attacked Hiraga Genshin in his fortress at Un no Kuchi, but was forced to retreat. Harunobu, at the rear of the withdrawing forces, waited until they were clear of the fortress, and then turned around, leading his men to defeat a castle garrison which was caught unprepared, having seen the Takeda flee.

Aftermath 
Shingen usurped his father as leader of the Takeda in 1541, and resolved to outdo Nobutora by conquering Shinano. He invaded the province in 1542 and ultimately spent over two decades fighting there.

References
Turnbull, Stephen (1998). 'The Samurai Sourcebook'. London: Cassell & Co. p209

1536 in Japan
Un no Kuchi 1536
Un no Kuchi